King George Bay is a bay indenting the south coast of King George Island for  between Lions Rump and Turret Point, in the South Shetland Islands. It was named on 24 January 1820 after the then-reigning sovereign of the United Kingdom, King George, by a British expedition under Edward Bransfield.

References

Bays of King George Island (South Shetland Islands)